Singhal is an Indian surname that has origins in the Sanskrit word simha, meaning leonine. Variant spellings include Singla. Among it is one of the 18 Gotra in Aggrawals lineage.

Notable people with this surname include:

Amit Singhal, former senior vice president of engineering at Uber and former head of Google Inc.'s Core Ranking Team
Anuraag Singhal, Florida judge
Arvind Singhal, Indian writer
Ashok Singhal, ex–International President of the Hindu organisation Vishwa Hindu Parishad
Bhim Singhal, Indian neurologist
Chand Singhal, Indian politician
Ira Singhal, Indian Bureaucrat
Krishan Chandra Singhal, Indian pharmacologist
Lokesh Kumar Singhal, Indian metallurgical engineer
Manimala Singhal, Indian cricketer
Ram Kishan Singhal, Indian politician
Supra Singhal, Ugandan swimmer

See also
 Singla

Indian surnames
Surnames of Indian origin
Agrawal